Iliesa Keresoni (born 27 January 1987 in Fiji) is a Fijian rugby union footballer.  He was the captain of the Lelean Memorial School 'Dream Team' of 2006 that won the Deans Trophy in the Fiji Secondary Schools Rugby Union competition of that year. He plays at fullback, wing and centre position for the Knights in the Colonial Cup and for the Fiji Warriors. He is the younger brother of Saracens centre, Kameli Ratuvou

Keresoni has three caps for the National Fijian team making his debut against Tonga in 2008 and played again for Fiji in 2010 against Japan where he scored a try. He played against New Zealand in 2011.

As of early 2010 he signed for Guinness Premiership runners-up Saracens.

He has played for the season 2010/2011 for CA Périgueux in the 3rd level of French championship. This team will play next season in Pro D2 (2nd division).

See also
Fiji Rugby Union on Wikipedia
Fiji Warriors on Wikipedia

External links
 Fiji Rugby profile

1987 births
Living people
People educated at Lelean Memorial School
Fijian rugby union players
Fijian expatriate rugby union players
Expatriate rugby union players in France
Fijian expatriate sportspeople in France
People from Tailevu Province
I-Taukei Fijian people
Fiji international rugby union players
Rugby union fullbacks